La Curandera is an opera composed by Robert Xavier Rodriguez to a primarily English libretto by Mary Medrick. It was commissioned and premiered by Opera Colorado in April 2006.

References
Robert Xavier Rodríguez: La Curandera, Programme Note, G. Schirmer, Inc, 2006. Retrieved 21 February 2008.
Information sheet from composer's website 
Marc Shulgold, Can opera magic conjure new fans? Rocky Mountain News, May 13, 2006. Retrieved 21 February 2008.

Operas
Operas by Robert Xavier Rodriguez
2006 operas
Operas set in Mexico
English-language operas